Harlem is a city in Columbia County, Georgia, United States. It is part of the Augusta metropolitan area. The population was 2,666 at the 2010 census, up from 1,814 in 2000. This city was named after the neighborhood in the borough of Manhattan. Harlem is the birthplace of comedian Oliver Hardy; the annual Harlem Oliver Hardy Festival is held on the first Saturday each October on Main Street in his honor.

History
From the building of the Georgia Railroad which passes through town until at least the 1860s, Harlem was known as Saw Dust.
The town is twinned with Ulverston in England, the birthplace of Stan Laurel, the partner of Oliver Hardy.

Geography
Harlem is located in southern Columbia County at  (33.416822, -82.313762), with its western boundary following the McDuffie County line. U.S. Routes 78 and 278 pass through the center of town, leading east  to downtown Augusta and west  to Thomson.

Demographics

2020 census

As of the 2020 United States census, there were 3,571 people, 1,021 households, and 645 families residing in the city.

2000 census
At the 2000 census there were 1,814 people in 704 households, including 506 families, in the city. The racial makup of the city was 70.95% White, 25.41% African American, 0.33% Native American, 0.88% Asian, 1.10% from other races, and 1.32% from two or more races. Hispanic or Latino of any race were 2.26%.

Of the 704 households 38.9% had children under the age of 18 living with them, 47.3% were married couples living together, 20.2% had a female householder with no husband present, and 28.0% were non-families. 24.1% of households were one person and 9.8% were one person aged 65 or older.  The average household size was 2.58 and the average family size was 3.07.

The age distribution was 29.2% under the age of 18, 8.7% from 18 to 24, 29.0% from 25 to 44, 20.6% from 45 to 64, and 12.6% 65 or older.  The median age was 34 years. For every 100 females, there were 80.3 males.  For every 100 females age 18 and over, there were 75.8 males.

The median household income was $30,500 and the median family income  was $36,307. Males had a median income of $27,833 versus $22,098 for females. The per capita income for the city was $15,439.  About 15.1% of families and 17.0% of the population were below the poverty line, including 24.1% of those under age 18 and 16.3% of those age 65 or over.

See also

Central Savannah River Area

References

External links
City of Harlem official website
Harlem at Georgia.gov

Cities in Georgia (U.S. state)
Cities in Columbia County, Georgia
Augusta metropolitan area